Dún Laoghaire and Rathdown was a parliamentary constituency represented in Dáil Éireann, the lower house of the Irish parliament or Oireachtas from 1948 to 1977. The constituency elected 3 (and later 4) deputies (Teachtaí Dála, commonly known as TDs) to the Dáil, on the system of proportional representation by means of the single transferable vote (PR-STV).

History and boundaries 
The constituency was located on the south coast of County Dublin.

TDs

Elections

1973 general election

1969 general election

1965 general election

1961 general election

1957 general election

1954 general election

1951 general election

1948 general election

See also 
Politics of the Republic of Ireland
Historic Dáil constituencies
Elections in the Republic of Ireland

References

External links
Oireachtas Members Database
Dublin Historic Maps: Parliamentary & Dail Constituencies 1780-1969 (a work in progress)
Dublin Historic Maps: Dublin Townships and Urban Districts, between 1847 and 1930
Dublin Historic Maps: Townlands of County Dublin

Dáil constituencies in County Dublin (historic)
Dún Laoghaire
1948 establishments in Ireland
1977 disestablishments in Ireland
Constituencies established in 1948
Constituencies disestablished in 1977